This is a list of Polsat primetime schedules since 2007.

2007–08 
New programs in  primetime:

Fall:
 Tylko miłość
 Ekipa
 Dzień kangura

Winter:
 Runaway
 Halo, Hans!

Spring:
 3 lbs
 Gwiezdny cyrk
 Strzał w 10
 Bones
 Misiek Koterski Show
 Dorota Gawryluk - konfrontacje

Summer:
 Spadkobiercy
 Numb3rs

2008–09 
New programs in primetime:

Fall:
 Agentki
 Na kocią łapę
 Piotr Bałtroczyk na żywo
 Fabryka Gwiazd
 Ranking gwiazd

Spring:
 Moment prawdy
 Synowie

2009–10 
New programs in primetime:

Fall:
 UEFA Champions League
 Synowie, czyli po moim trupie
 Skorumpowani
 Światowe rekordy Guinessa

Winter:
 Kidnapped
 Journeyman
 War and Peace
 The Beast
 Damages

Spring:
 Hotel 52
 Przeznaczenie
 Tylko nas dwoje. Just the Two of Us
 Zabić z miłości

Summer:
 Boston Legal

2010–11 
New programs in primetime:

Fall:
 Szpilki na Giewoncie
 Stand up. Zabij mnie śmiechem
 Ludzie Chudego

Winter:
 7420. Milion od zaraz
 Killer Instinct

Spring:
 Linia życia
 Women's Murder Club
 Must Be the Music. Tylko muzyka

Summer:
 New Amsterdam

2011–12 
New programs in primetime:

Fall:
 Pamiętniki z wakacji
 Państwo w państwie

Winter:
 The Listener

Spring:
 Got to Dance. Tylko taniec
 Breaking Bad

Summer:
 Greatest American Dog

2012–13 
New programs in primetime:

Fall:
 Przyjaciółki
 Nieprawdopodobne, a jednak...

Winter:

Spring:

Summer:

See also 
 Polsat

References

Television in Poland